Jenna Kingsley (born 24 March 1992) is a retired Australian soccer player, who played for Central Coast Mariners, Western Sydney Wanderers, and Newcastle Jets in the Australian W-League.

Early life
Kingsley was born in Penrith and grew up in Cambridge Park. She is a cousin of English footballer Kyle Bartley.

Club career

Junior football
Kingsley played her junior football in Western Sydney for Emu Plains, Penrith RSL and Penrith SC.

Central Coast Mariners
Kingsley made her debut for Central Coast Mariners against Newcastle Jets on Saturday, 29 November 2008 after being substituted on for teammate Britt Simmons. She then made her scoring debut in round 7 against Adelaide United scoring a double and assisting the team to a record 6–0 win away from home. Kingsley then scored her third goal in the last round of her first season against Melbourne Victory assisting the team to a 2–0 win at home which knocked Melbourne out of the finals.

Western Sydney Wanderers
In 2012, Kingsley joined new expansion club Western Sydney Wanderers for their inaugural season.

Newcastle Jets
Kingsley joined Newcastle Jets ahead of the 2015–16 W-League season.

International career
Kingsley made her first appearance for the Australia women's national soccer team against Hong Kong in an Olympic Games qualifier as a second-half substitute for Caitlin Cooper. She then scored the final goal of the match in the 83rd minute to make the score 8–1. Her debut game featured seven other, then-fellow Mariners' teammates Rachael Doyle, Lyndsay Glohe, Teresa Polias, Renee Rollason, Ellyse Perry, Kyah Simon and Caitlin Cooper. to this day she has made 74 appearances scoring 51 goals for the Australian women's national team.

Retirement
In November 2020, Kingsley retired from football after making 288 appearances, and scoring 189 goals in the W-League.

References

External links
 Young Matildas profile

1992 births
Living people
Australian women's soccer players
Central Coast Mariners FC (A-League Women) players
Western Sydney Wanderers FC (A-League Women) players
Newcastle Jets FC (A-League Women) players
A-League Women players
Women's association football forwards